Abdelkrim Bendjemil (born 5 December 1959, in Oran) is a former Algerian handball player.

He played for MC Oran and win many national and international titles. And for the Algerian national team, and participated at the 1980 Summer Olympics, 1984 Summer Olympics and 1988 Summer Olympics, and 2 world championship (1982 and 1986) and win many titles too.

External links
 Abdelkrim Bendjemil : Une grande figure du handball algérien (journal stars)

Living people
MC Oran Handball players
Algerian male handball players
Olympic handball players of Algeria
Handball players at the 1980 Summer Olympics
Handball players at the 1984 Summer Olympics
Handball players at the 1988 Summer Olympics
Sportspeople from Oran
Algerian expatriates in France
1959 births
African Games gold medalists for Algeria
African Games medalists in handball
Competitors at the 1978 All-Africa Games
Competitors at the 1987 All-Africa Games
21st-century Algerian people
20th-century Algerian people